Thopia may refer to:

 Thopia family, one of the most powerful Albanian feudal families in the Late Middle Ages
 Tanusio Thopia
 Karl Thopia
 George Thopia
 Helena Thopia
 Niketa Thopia
 Andrea Thopia
 Tanush Thopia

See also
 Topia (disambiguation)